The Ezra Allred Cottage was listed on the National Register of Historic Places in 1982.  See also Ezra Allred Bungalow.

It is a shiplap-sided small house with Queen Anne detailing in its porch and in its gable above its main window.  The listing includes also a granary.

References

Houses on the National Register of Historic Places in Idaho
Queen Anne architecture in Idaho
Houses completed in 1890
Bear Lake County, Idaho